Jagtap is an Indian surname. Notable people with the name include:

 Aditya Jagtap (born 1992), Indian squash player
 Bhai Jagtap, Indian politician
 Laxman Pandurang Jagtap (born 1963), Indian politician
 Manali Jagtap (born 1978), Indian politician and artist
 Mitalee Jagtap, Indian actress
 Sangram Arun Jagtap, Indian politician
 Vilasrao Narayan Jagtap, Indian politician
 Virendra Jagtap (born 1963), Indian politician

Indian surnames